Johnathan Ryan Graham (born January 14, 1990) is an American former professional baseball pitcher. He made his MLB debut with the Minnesota Twins and played for the team from 2015 to 2016.

Amateur career
Graham was born in Livermore, California, on January 14, 1990, to Brian and Julie Graham. His mother Julie is legally blind due to the effects of Best disease, and when Graham started Little League as a shortstop, he wore white cleats instead of black ones at his father's suggestion and to help him stand out on the diamond. Graham dropped the different colored cleats and began wearing stirrups at age twelve or thirteen. He pitched and played shortstop while in high school.

Professional career

Atlanta Braves
Graham was drafted by the Oakland Athletics in the 46th round of the 2008 Major League Baseball Draft out of Livermore High School in Livermore, California. He did not sign, choosing instead to attend Santa Clara University, where he began pitching full-time. He was then drafted by the Atlanta Braves in the fourth round of the 2011 Major League Baseball Draft.

Graham pitched for the Lynchburg Hillcats of the Class A-Advanced Carolina League and the Mississippi Braves of the Class AA Southern League in 2012 and 2013. He went 12–2 with a 2.80 earned run average and 110 strikeouts in 148 innings pitched. Prior to the 2013 season, Baseball America ranked Graham as the 93rd best prospect in baseball.

Minnesota Twins
At the 2014 Winter Meetings, the Minnesota Twins selected Graham from the Braves in the Rule 5 draft. Graham made his major league debut on April 6, 2015, pitching two scoreless innings in relief of Phil Hughes against the Detroit Tigers.

New York Yankees
The Twins designated Graham for assignment on May 6, and traded him to the New York Yankees on May 14 for a player to be named later or cash considerations. He spent the 2016 season with the Trenton Thunder of the Class AA Eastern League and Scranton/Wilkes-Barre RailRiders of the Class AAA International League. The Yankees outrighted Graham to Scranton/Wilkes-Barre on September 26. He was released on January 21, 2018.

See also
Rule 5 draft results

References

External links

Santa Clara Broncos bio

1990 births
Living people
People from Livermore, California
Baseball players from California
Major League Baseball pitchers
Minnesota Twins players
Santa Clara Broncos baseball players
Danville Braves players
Lynchburg Hillcats players
Mississippi Braves players
Rochester Red Wings players
Trenton Thunder players
Staten Island Yankees players
Scranton/Wilkes-Barre RailRiders players
Madison Mallards players